The Man Who Laughs is a 2012 French/Czech romantic musical drama film produced by EuropaCorp and based on the 1869 eponymous novel by Victor Hugo.

Cast 
 Marc-André Grondin as Gwynplaine 
 Christa Théret as Dea
 Gérard Depardieu as Ursus 
 Arben Bajraktaraj as Hardquanone 
 Serge Merlin as Barkilphedro
 Emmanuelle Seigner as La duchesse Josiane

Reception

Boyd Van Hoeij from Variety was critical of the film, writing, "Less faithful to its source material and more concerned with delivering the goods visually, this handsome, studio-shot pic, somewhat ironically, lacks genuine pathos in telling its tale of how deceiving looks can be." Neil Young from The Hollywood Reporter gave the film a positive review, writing, "Thoroughly old-fashioned but ultimately moving literary adaptation has more than enough exploitable features to indicate long-term commercial success."

References

External links 
 
 
 

2012 films
2010s historical romance films
2012 romantic drama films
French historical romance films
French romantic drama films
Films based on French novels
Films based on works by Victor Hugo
Films about blind people
Films set in the 1680s
Films set in the 1700s
Films set in England
2010s French-language films
American musical films
Films scored by Hans Zimmer
2010s American films
2010s French films